Marton Vincze or Márton Vincze (1905–1941) was a Hungarian art director who designed the sets for over eighty films during his career.

Selected filmography
 The Old Scoundrel (1932)
 And the Plains Are Gleaming (1933)
 A Night in Venice (1934)
 Peter (1934)
 Ball at the Savoy (1935)
 Mother (1937)
 Marika (1938)
 Rézi Friday (1938)
 Roxy and the Wonderteam (1938)

References

Bibliography
 Waldman, Harry. Missing Reels: Lost Films of American and European Cinema. McFarland, 2000.

External links

1905 births
1941 deaths
Hungarian art directors